Martin Buß (born 7 April 1976) is a German high jumper who won the gold medal at the 2001 World Championships in Edmonton, Alberta, Canada. He is a five-time outdoor national champion for Germany in the men's high jump event and three-time champion at the German Indoor Athletics Championships.

Born in West Berlin, Buß took up the sport at the age of 17 and competed in his first World Championships in 1997, finishing ninth. At the 1999 World Championships in Seville, Spain he won a surprising bronze medal behind Vyacheslav Voronin and Mark Boswell. His jump of 2.32 metres was 5 cm behind the winner.

However, Buß came back two years later and won the gold medal at Edmonton with a jump of 2.36 m, beating Yaroslav Rybakov and old rival Voronin. Among the field which Martin beat was the legendary Javier Sotomayor. It marked a fine comeback after he suffered an injury to his Achilles tendon the year before.

He later missed both the 2000 and 2004 Summer Olympics through injury, and retired in late 2006 because of the persistent injury problems.

International competitions

National titles
German Athletics Championships
High jump: 1997, 1998, 1999, 2001, 2002
German Indoor Athletics Championships
High jump: 1999, 2000, 2001

References

1976 births
Living people
Athletes from Berlin
German male high jumpers
World Athletics Championships medalists
World Athletics Championships athletes for Germany
World Athletics Championships winners